Los Caminantes are a Mexican Grupera band hailing from San Francisco del Rincón, Guanajuato led by singer-songwriter Agustín Ramírez. Originally called Los Caminantes Aztecas, the group was formed in San Bernardino County, California by brothers: Agustín, Brígido, Horacio and Bernardo Ramírez in the mid-1970s. In 1982, Martín Ramírez, the youngest brother of the band, joined the group replacing Bernardo on keyboards. They later acquired Humberto Navarro as their drummer. The band released their debut album Supe Perder in 1983 on Luna Records including hits, "Supe Perder," "Para Que Quieres Volver" and "Dime Si Me Quieres."

Throughout the mid-1980s to mid-1990s, the band had a number of Billboard 200 chart hit albums such as 1986's De Guanajuato...Para America! with hit song, "Amor Sin Palabras" ("Love Without Words"). Tragedy struck Los Caminantes when Martín was killed in a bus accident. In the same year a tribute album, 1987's Gracias Martin, was dedicated to him.

They filmed a movie, 1990's Caminantes...Si Hay Caminos.

Los Caminantes are commonly referred to as Los Chulos, Chulos, Chulos,
a nickname given by a disc jockey circa the De Guanajuato...Para America! era, as they're seen wearing formal tuxedos, "¡Llegaron Los Chulos, Chulos, Chulos!" ("Los Chulos, Chulos, Chulos have arrived!").

Los Caminantes are also known for their playing of a variety of Regional Mexican styles, e.g. Ranchera, Corrido, Balada, Cumbia, Banda and Mariachi. They have recorded over 30 albums throughout their career span and had numerous song collaborations with high-profile Regional Mexican acts (Diana Reyes, Patrulla 81, Polo Urías y su Maquina Norteña, Banda Pachuco, etc.).

Agustín and Los Caminantes continued to record and tour throughout the United States, Mexico, South America, and Central America. Agustín Ramírez died on October 26, 2022.

Discography

Albums 
1983: Supe Perder
1983: Especialmente Para Usted
1983: Numero Tres
1984: Corridos Al Estilo De Los Caminantes
1984: Porque Tengo Tu Amor
1985: Cada Día Mejor
1986: De Guanajuato...Para America!
1987: Gracias Martín
1988: Los Idolos Del Pueblo
1988: Incontenibles Romanticos
1989: No Cantan Mal Las Rancheras
1990: Enamorados
1990: Tropicalísimos
1991: Dos Cartas y Una Flor
1992: Recuerdos
1993: Buenos Vaqueros
1994: En Vivo
1994: A Todisima...Banda
1994: Lagrimas Al Recordar
1995: Por Ese Amor
1996: Con Mariachi
1996: Corridos Bravos
1997: Con Tinta Del Corazon
1998: Baraja Adicta
1999: Con Canciones
1999: Rumbo Al Sur
2000: Cielo
2000: Sueño Contigo
2001: De Pueblo En Pueblo
2002: Cuando Quiere Un Mexicano
2003: Con Banda Sinaloense
2007: Aunque Mal Paguen Ellas
2008: Celebrando Nuestro 25 Aniversario
2009: En Vivo! Desde Tijuana, San Diego y Mexicali
2013: Los Chulos, Chulos, Chulos

Compilations
1983: 15 Exitos, Vol. 1
1985: 15 Exitos, Vol. 2
1986: Cumbias Al Estilo De Los Caminantes
1987: 15 Exitos, Vol. 3
1993: 10 Años
1993: 21 Exitos, Vol. 1
1997: 15 Aniversario
1999: 21 Exitos, Vol. 2
1999: 20th Anniversary
2001: Nuestras Canciones Romanticas Favoritas: 20 Exitazos
2002: Nuestras Canciones Rancheras Favoritas: 20 Exitazos
2002: Colección de Oro
2002: 20 Corridazos
2002: 20 Cumbias Sin Parar
2003: Mis 30 Mejores Canciones
2004: Tesoros de Colección: Puras Rancheras
2005: Tesoros de Colección: Lo Romantico de Los Caminantes
2007: La Historia: Lo Mas Chulo, Chulo, Chulo
2008: Caminantes Si Hay Caminos: Sus Rancheras Mas Chula
2009: En Vivo! Desde Tijuana, San Diego y Mexicali
2009: Moviditas y Cumbias Bien Chulas
2010: Mis Favoritas
2011: La Historia de Los Exitos
2013: Iconos: 25 Exitos

Music DVD
2007: La Historia: Lo Mas Chulo, Chulo, Chulo
2008: Caminantes Si Hay Caminos: Sus Rancheras Mas Chula
2009: En Vivo! Desde Tijuana, San Diego y Mexicali
2009: Moviditas y Cumbias Bien Chulas

Filmography
1990: Caminantes...Si Hay Caminos

References

External links
Official Website Los Caminantes
 
Facebook Los Caminantes

Mexican musical groups
Musicians from Guanajuato
Musical groups established in the 1970s
Grupera music groups